Mali Ston (which means Little Ston) is a village in Croatia on the Pelješac peninsula approximately one kilometer northeast of its larger sister village, Ston. It's linked to Ston by the Walls of Ston and is less than an hour northwest of Dubrovnik via the D414 highway. With its location on the Bay of Mali Ston, the village is well known for oyster production.

Mali Ston is known for its amazing seafood, primarily sea shell cuisine.

Gallery

References

Populated places in Dubrovnik-Neretva County